John William Patrick Smith (born 17 March 1951) is a Welsh Labour Party politician who was the Member of Parliament (MP) for the Vale of Glamorgan from the 1989 by-election to 1992 and from 1997 to the 2010 general elections.

Early life
Born in Penarth, he attended Fairfield County Primary School in Penarth. Subsequent to him passing the 'Eleven Plus Exam' he attended Penarth County Grammar School (which later became the comprehensive Stanwell School). He served for a while in the Royal Air Force, then worked as a carpenter and joiner for Vale Borough Council from 1971 to 1976. He became a mature student in 1976, studying at the Gwent College of Higher Education, then went to University College of Wales, Cardiff (now Cardiff University) graduating with a BSc in 1981. He was then a university tutor until 1985. From 1985 to 1989, he was a senior lecturer in Business Studies. He became a campaign manager for Gwent Image Partnership, becoming chief executive from 1992 after he lost his seat by only 19 votes.

Parliamentary career
Having contested Vale of Glamorgan at the 1987 general election, he was first elected for the seat in a 1989 by-election, lost it to the Conservatives in 1992 by a very narrow margin, and regained it in 1997. He was re-elected in 2001 and 2005, and served as a member of the Defence Select Committee. He spent much of his time dealing with concerns over the future of RAF St Athan. On the issue of the Iraq War, Smith opposed any form of military action, and was deeply saddened by the parliamentary vote that supported British involvement in the war.

On 22 May 2009, Smith announced that he would stand down at the 2010 general election.

Smith was a Member of the Defence Committee, and Chairman of the Wales Anti-Apartheid Movement (WAAM)

Personal life
Smith came from a working class family, born and raised on a council estate. He married Kathleen Mulvaney (now Kathleen Smith) in 1971 in Liverpool. They have two sons and a daughter, and are now Grandparents.

References

External links
 Guardian Unlimited Politics - Ask Aristotle: John Smith MP
 TheyWorkForYou.com - John Smith MP
 Vale of Glamorgan Labour
 BBC Politics Profile
 Wales Online
 (Mixed with the British labour leader with the same name.)

News items
 RAF St Athan in March 2005
 RAF St Athan in October 2004
 RAF St Athan in July 2003
 Cardiff Airport in December 2002

1951 births
Living people
Welsh Labour Party MPs
UK MPs 1987–1992
UK MPs 1997–2001
UK MPs 2001–2005
UK MPs 2005–2010
Alumni of the University of Wales
Alumni of Cardiff University
People from Penarth
People educated at Stanwell School
Politics of the Vale of Glamorgan